Sally Jones may refer to:
 Sally-Anne Jones, ISIS terrorist
 Sally Jones (journalist), British journalist, television news and sports presenter
 Sally Forster Jones, Los Angeles-based real estate broker
 Sally Roberts Jones, English-born Welsh poet, publisher and critic